"Arklow Hill" or "Ballymoyle Hill" dominates the town of Arklow to the south and is situated in the southeastern section of the Wicklow Mountains, just 2 km from the Irish Sea coast. It is a prominent feature from the N11  National primary route which passes a kilometer east of the summit. 

In the late 1960s and early 1970s when NET Nitrate (a chemical company) was producing fertilizer in the local factory in the Avoca valley, the letters N-E-T were spelt out in dark green on the southern slope of the hill, visible from the main road (the modern N11). This was achieved by spreading nitrogen fertilizer on meadow on the hill in the shape of the letters, which advertised the effectiveness of Nitrogen in producing vigorous growth compared to the area  outside the fertilized zone. It was like a biological version of the Hollywood sign.

See also
Wicklow Mountains

References

External links
Wicklow Mountains National Park

Mountains and hills of County Wicklow
Arklow